The 1996 Boston University Terriers football team was an American football team that represented Boston University as a member of the Yankee Conference during the 1996 NCAA Division I-AA football season. The Terriers compiled a 1–10 record (0–8 against conference opponents), finished last in the Yankee Conference's New England Division, and were outscored by a total of 373 to 119.

The school hired Tom Masella as its head football coach in December 1995. He had previously been an assistant coach under Dan Allen before leaving in 1995 to become head football coach at Fairfield University.

Schedule

References

Boston University
Boston University Terriers football seasons
Boston University Terriers football